Moment of Truth is a five-episode American documentary series that explores the murder of James R. Jordan Sr., the father of Michael Jordan, in 1993. It premiered on IMDb TV on April 21, 2021.

Premise
It is the story behind the murder of James Jordan in North Carolina, as well as the subsequent trial.

Episodes

Reception
Richard Roeper awarded Moment of Truth 3 and 1/2 out of 4 stars and called the series, "a stunningly revelatory five-part IMDb TV documentary series." The series currently sits at 100% fresh rating on Rotten Tomatoes based on 5 reviews.

References

External links
 

2021 American television series debuts
2020s American documentary television series
Documentary television series about crime in the United States
Television series by Amazon Studios
Cultural depictions of Michael Jordan